The Women's road race of the 2013 Dutch National Road Race Championships cycling event took place on 22 June 2013 in and around Kerkrade in the province Limburg, the Netherlands. The race consisted of 13 laps of 8.8 km making a total distance of 114.4 km. 28 of the 133 women's finished the race.

Lucinda Brand rode away from the bunch in the second lap. After losing many riders in the chasing group due to many attacks of the other  riders, only the  rider Ellen van Dijk, Argos-Shimano rider Amy Pieters and two  riders Marianne Vos and Annemiek van Vleuten were together in the front. With a few laps to go also Pieters could not keep up the pace. Despite the fact that Van Dijk rode really strong in the chasing group, she had to abandon the race due to a broken derailleur in the second last lap. From then on Vos and Van Vleuten stopped chasing and so Brand won the race.

Final results (top 10)

Source

See also
2013 Dutch National Time Trial Championships – Women's time trial
2013 national road cycling championships

References

External links
Official website 

Dutch National Road Race Championships (women)
Road Race Championships - Women's road race
Dutch National Road Race Championships - Women's road race